FC Inkomsport Yalta was a football team based in Yalta, 
Crimea.

Team names
Source: 
 2015–2016: FC Asgard Yalta
 2016–2017: SK Yalta
 2017: MSK Yalta-Avangard
 2017–2018: MSK Mriya-Avangard Yalta
 2018: FC Inkomsport-Avangard Yalta
 2018–2020: FC Inkomsport Yalta

League and cup history (Crimea)
{|class="wikitable"
|-bgcolor="#efefef"
! Season
! Div.
! Pos.
! Pl.
! W
! D
! L
! GS
! GA
! P
!Domestic Cup
!colspan=2|Europe
!Notes
|- align=center bgcolor=LightCyan
|align=center|2016–17
|align=center|2nd Open Championship
|align=center|4/13
|align=center|23
|align=center|12
|align=center|2
|align=center|9
|align=center|58
|align=center|54
|align=center|38
|align=center| finals
|align=center|
|align=center|
|align=center|
|- bgcolor=LightCyan
|align=center|2017–18
|align=center|2nd Open Championship
|align=center bgcolor=tan|3/13
|align=center|24
|align=center|16
|align=center|4
|align=center|4
|align=center|69
|align=center|34
|align=center|52
|align=center| finals
|align=center|
|align=center|
|align=center bgcolor=lightgreen|1st–2nd league match (winner, promoted)
|-
|align=center|2018–19
|align=center|1st Premier League
|align=center|7/8
|align=center|28
|align=center|10
|align=center|1
|align=center|17
|align=center|34
|align=center|55
|align=center|31
|align=center| finals
|align=center|
|align=center|
|align=center|1st–2nd league match (winner)
|-
|align=center|2019–20
|align=center|1st Premier League
|align=center|8/8
|align=center|28
|align=center|5
|align=center|6
|align=center|17
|align=center|38
|align=center|65
|align=center|21
|align=center bgcolor=tan| finals
|align=center|
|align=center|
|align=center bgcolor=pink|Relegated
|-
|}

References

External links
Inkomsport Yalta on CrimeanSport.ru 

Defunct football clubs in Yalta
Association football clubs established in 2015
Association football clubs disestablished in 2020
2015 establishments in Russia
2020 disestablishments in Russia